The 2002–03 Maltese First Division started on 7 September 2002 and finished on 4 May 2003. Naxxar Lions and Lija Athletic were relegated from Maltese Premier League. Msida Saint-Joseph and Senglea Athletic were promoted from Maltese Second Division. Msida Saint-Joseph were the champions and Balzan Youths were promoted to Maltese Premier League.

Msida Saint-Joseph were the champions of the 2000–01 Maltese Third Division and a year later they were the champions of the 2001–02 Maltese Second Division. Therefore, they were promoted for three straight years to go to the top level. Gozo and Xgħajra Tornados were relegated to Maltese Second Division.

Participating teams

The Maltese First Division 2002–03 was made up of these teams:
 Balzan Youths
 Gozo
 Lija Athletic
 Mqabba
 Msida Saint-Joseph
 Naxxar Lions
 Rabat Ajax
 Senglea Athletic
 St. Patrick
 Xgħajra Tornados

Changes from previous season

 Marsaxlokk and Mosta were promoted from the First Division to the Premier League. They were replaced by Naxxar Lions and Lija Athletic, both relegated from 2001–02 Maltese Premier League.
 Qormi and St. Andrews were relegated to the 2002–03 Maltese Second Division. They were replaced with Msida Saint-Joseph, champions of 2001–02 Maltese Second Division and Senglea Athletic, runner-up.

Final league table

Results
For a complete set of results, see 1

Top scorers

References

Maltese First Division seasons
Malta
2

lt:Maltos pirmoji futbolo lyga